The olive-colored white-eye (Zosterops oleagineus), also known as the olive white-eye, Yap olive white-eye or great Yap white-eye, is a species of bird in the family Zosteropidae.

Distribution and habitat
It is endemic to the Micronesian island of Yap. Its natural habitats are tropical moist lowland and mangrove forests. It is threatened by habitat loss.

Taxonomy
It is often placed in the genus Rukia with the teardrop and long-billed white-eyes and is most similar in plumage to the former.

References

olive-colored white-eye
Birds of Yap
olive-colored white-eye
Taxonomy articles created by Polbot